Regina Regina is the only album by the American country music duo Regina Regina. It was released on Giant Records on January 28, 1997. The album includes the single "More Than I Wanted to Know".

Critical reception
Giving it 3 out of 5 stars, Stephen Thomas Erlewine of Allmusic called the album "an appealing set of contemporary country distinguished by Regina Nicks and Regina Leigh's pure, close harmonies, which help give weight even to the mediocre material that clutters the record." He thought that the single "More Than I Wanted to Know" was a "highlight". Dan Kuchar of Country Standard Time gave the album a positive review, saying that it had a "well-defined trademark sound" and was "high-energy country pumped up with heavier than normal drums and guitars". He thought that the album had pop crossover potential. Giving it a "C+", Alanna Nash of Entertainment Weekly thought that the songs were "better-than-average country pop" but that both members of the duo were weak vocalists.

Track listing
"More Than I Wanted to Know" (Bob Regan, Michael Noble) — 2:48
"The Big Bad Broken Heart" (Mark D. Sanders, Ed Hill) — 3:09
"Asking for the Moon" (Chapin Hartford, George Teren) — 3:01
"A Far Cry from Him" (Rick Giles, Susan Longacre) — 4:21
"Ticket Out of Kansas" (Tia Sillers) — 3:53
"Border Town Road" (Wally Wilson, Larry Boone, Paul Nelson) — 3:18
"I Should Be Laughing" (Patty Smyth, Glen Burtnik) — 4:07
"Right Plan, Wrong Man" (Bill Douglas, Pebe Sebert) — 2:59
"Before I Knew About You" (Gary Burr, Tom Shapiro) — 3:16
"She'll Let That Telephone Ring" (Tim Mensy, Liz Hengber) — 3:30

Personnel
Compiled from liner notes.

Regina Regina
Regina Leigh — vocals
Regina Nicks — vocals

Musicians
Larry Byrom — acoustic guitar
Stuart Duncan — fiddle
Paul Franklin — steel guitar
Stephen Hill — background vocals
Dann Huff — electric guitar
Tony King — acoustic guitar, background vocals
Brent Mason — electric guitar
Steve Nathan — piano, keyboards
Michael Rhodes — bass guitar
Brent Rowan — electric guitar
James Stroud — drums
Billy Joe Walker, Jr. — acoustic guitar
Lonnie Wilson — drums

Technical
Kevin Beamish — additional recording
Mark Hagen — assistant
Julian King — recording
Chris Lord-Alge — mixing
Abbe Nameche — production assistant
Doug Rich — production assistant
James Stroud — production
Craig White — assistant
Wally Wilson — production

Singles

References

1997 debut albums
Giant Records (Warner) albums
Regina Regina albums
Albums produced by James Stroud
Albums produced by Wally Wilson